Sheena M. Joyce (born  July 26, 1976) is an American film producer currently based in Philadelphia, Pennsylvania.

Joyce produced the films Rock School (2005), Head Space (2006), Two Days in April (2007), The Art of the Steal (2009), and Last Days Here (2011).  She made her co-directorial debut with Don Argott with 2012's The Atomic States of America.

She co-owns 9.14 Pictures with Argott.

Filmography
Director
The Atomic States of America (2012, co-directed by Don Argott)
Batman & Bill (2017, co-directed by Don Argott)

Producer
Rock School (2005)
Head Space (2006)Two Days in April (2007)The Art of the Steal (2009)Last Days Here'' (2011)

References

External links
 9.14 Pictures

American film producers
1976 births
Living people